Radek Jaroš (born 29 April 1964) is a Czech mountaineer and author. 

Jaroš was born in Nové Město na Moravě, Czechoslovakia, now Czech Republic. In 1998 he climbed his first eight-thousander Mount Everest in the second attempt via its north face. In 2001, 2003 and 2005 he unsuccessfully tried to climb the K2. In 2002, along with Martin Minařík he climbed Kanchenjunga as the first Czech. In 2006 announced he planned to conquer all the eight-thousand peaks of the world. As of 2014, he is the only Czech climber to conquer all 14 eight-thousanders and thereby complete the "Crown of the Himalaya".
Moreover, he was able to ascend all of these mountains without the use of supplemental oxygen, which made him the world's 15th person to accomplish this feat.

Successful ascents on eight-thousanders 
 1998: Mount Everest
 2002: Kangchenjunga
 2003: Broad Peak
 2004: Cho Oyu
 2004: Shishapangma
 2005: Nanga Parbat
 2008: Dhaulagiri
 2008: Makalu
 2009: Manaslu (solo)
 2010: Gasherbrum II
 2010: Gasherbrum I
 2011: Lhotse (solo) 
 2012: Annapurna
 2014: K2

References

External links
Official website

1964 births
Living people
Czech mountain climbers
Summiters of all 14 eight-thousanders
Summiters of the Seven Summits
People from Nové Město na Moravě